The Gorzów Wielkopolski tram system is a tram system in Gorzów Wielkopolski, Poland, that has been in operation since 1899. Currently, Gorzów Wielkopolski has three tram lines.

Lines

(The crossed out lines and sections are out of service until summer 2022.)

History
Damages in World War II resulted in the replacement of trams with trolleybuses from 1941 until 1947, with tram services being reinstated afterwards.

From October 1, 2017, all services were suspended in order to modernize the network. Trial runs began on April 16, 2020. Regular services on line 1 resumed from July 2, 2020. Since October 26, 2020, the trams terminate at the Dowgielewiczowej stop to allow the extension of the line to Gen. Emila Fieldorfa-Nila to be built.

The branch to the railway station, unused since 2012, is going to be refurbished as well.

Future plans
A new line, from Rondo Ofiar Katynia (near the Park Kopernika stop), through al. Ruchu Młodzieży Niezależnej, Piłsudskiego, Górczyńska, Okulickiego, Szarych Szeregów to Walczaka (near the Silwana stop) is planned.

Rolling stock
The fleet consists of 14 Pesa Twist low-floor trams, 8 ex-Kassel 6ZGTW/6EGTW trams, built by Duewag, Credé, and Wegmann, and two Konstal 105Na.

References

External links

Sustainable Urban Transport System in Gorzów Wielkopolski 
Grudziądz tramway at UrbanRail.net

Gorzow
Gorzów Wielkopolski
Gorzow